Adolphe Deledda (Villa Minozzo (Italy), 26 September 1919 — Die, 9 October 2003) was an Italian/French professional road bicycle racer.
Italian by birth, he was naturalized French the 20 April 1948.

Major results

1943
Circuit de Drome - Ardèche
1945
Chalon-sur-Saone
1947
Vuelta a España:
Winner stage 4
1949
Tour du Doubs
Tour de France:
Winner stage 6
1951
Tour de France:
Winner stage 24
1952
 national road race champion
1955
G.P.Morange

References

External links 

Official Tour de France results for Adolphe Deledda

1919 births
2003 deaths
French Tour de France stage winners
French Vuelta a España stage winners
Italian male cyclists
French male cyclists
People from the Province of Reggio Emilia
Cyclists from Emilia-Romagna
Sportspeople from the Province of Reggio Emilia